Justice Morris may refer to:

Brian Morris (judge) (born 1963), associate justice of the Montana Supreme Court
Charles Morris (surveyor general) (1711–1781), chief justice of the Nova Scotia Supreme Court
Claude F. Morris (1869–1957), associate justice of the Montana Supreme Court
Douglas J. Morris (1861–1928), associate justice of the Indiana Supreme Court
George E. Morris (died 1919), associate justice of the Washington Supreme Court
James Morris (North Dakota judge) (1893–1980), associate justice of the North Dakota Supreme Court
Lewis Morris (governor) (1671–1746), chief justice of the Colonial New York Supreme Court
Martin Ferdinand Morris (1834–1909), associate justice of the Court of Appeals of the District of Columbia
Michael Morris, Baron Morris (1826–1901), Lord Chief Justice of Ireland
Richard Morris (Texas judge) (1815–1844), associate justice of the Texas Supreme Court
Richard Morris (New York judge) (1730–1810), chief justice of the New York Supreme Court
Robert Morris (judge) (1745–1815), chief justice of the Supreme Court of New Jersey
Robert Hunter Morris (c. 1700–1764), chief justice of the Supreme Court of New Jersey
Thomas Morris (Ohio politician) (1776–1844), associate justice of the Ohio State Supreme Court

See also
Judge Morris (disambiguation)